Eurovision is a pan-European television telecommunications network owned and operated by the European Broadcasting Union (EBU). It was founded 1954 in Geneva, Switzerland, and its first official transmission took place on 6 June 1954.

Major television broadcasts are distributed live through the Eurovision network to EBU members. Members share breaking news footage through the daily Eurovision news exchange (EVN). They also exchange television programmes through the network.

The EBU department that operated the Eurovision network became a separate company under Swiss law (société anonyme) in 2019, with the EBU as its sole shareholder.

In January 2023, Eurovision SA was sold to a German investment advisory team, DUBAG AG, based in Munich. The terms of the agreement were not published.

The EBU has also owned and operated a radio counterpart, Euroradio, since 1989.

Background
The name "Eurovision" was originally coined by British journalist George Campey when writing for the Evening Standard, and was adopted by the EBU for its network.

The first official Eurovision transmission took place on 6 June 1954. It broadcast the Narcissus Festival in Montreux, Switzerland, followed by an evening program from Rome, including a tour of the Vatican, an address from Pope Pius XII and an apostolic blessing.

Eurovision was managed by the European Broadcasting Union’s Eurovision Operations Department and offered permanent coverage of Europe, the Americas, the Middle East, North Africa and the Asia-Pacific region, as well as ad-hoc coverage of the African continent and the Pacific Rim.

Not confined only to Europe, the EBU currently encompasses 75 television broadcasting organizations located in 56 countries of Europe, North Africa, and the Middle East. Furthermore, there are 61 associated broadcasting organizations in Europe, Africa, America, Asia, and Oceania.

Events
The EBU in co-operation with the respective host broadcaster, organises competitions and events in which its Members can participate, if they wish to do so. These include:

Eurovision Song Contest

The Eurovision Song Contest is an annual international song competition that was first held in Lugano, Switzerland, on 24 May 1956. Seven countries participated – each submitting two songs, for a total of 14. This was the only contest in which more than one song per country was performed: since 1957 all contests have allowed one entry per country. The  was won by the host nation, Switzerland. In this competition, only countries that are members of the EBU can participate.

Let the Peoples Sing

Let the Peoples Sing is a biennial choir competition, the participants of which are chosen from radio recordings entered by EBU radio members. The final, encompassing three categories and around ten choirs, is offered as a live broadcast to all EBU members. The overall winner is awarded the Silver Rose Bowl.

Jeux sans frontières

Jeux sans frontières (or Games Without Borders) was a Europe-wide television game show. In its original conception, it was broadcast from 1965 to 1999 under the auspices of the EBU. The original series run ended in 1982 but was revived in 1988 with a different complexion of nations and was hosted by smaller broadcasters.

Eurovision Young Musicians

Eurovision Young Musicians is a competition for European musicians that are younger than 19 years old. It is organised by the EBU and is a member of EMCY. The first competition was held in Manchester, United Kingdom on 11 May 1982.

The televised competition is held every two years, with some countries holding national heats. Since its foundation in 1982, the Eurovision Young Musicians competition has become one of the most important music competitions on an international level.

Eurovision Young Dancers

The Eurovision Young Dancers was a biennial dance showcase broadcast on television throughout Europe. The first competition was held in Reggio Emilia, Italy, on 16 June 1985.

It uses a format similar to the Eurovision Song Contest, every country that is a member of the EBU has had the opportunity to send a dance act to compete for the title of "Eurovision Young Dancer". The act can be either a solo act or a dance couple, and all contestants must be between the ages of 16 and 21 years and not professionally engaged.

Junior Eurovision Song Contest

Junior Eurovision Song Contest, is an annual international song competition, that was first held in Copenhagen, Denmark, on 15 November 2003. Sixteen countries participated in the inaugural edition – each submitting one song, for a total of 16 entries. The 2003 contest was won by Croatia.

Eurovision Dance Contest

The Eurovision Dance Contest (not to be confused with the Eurovision Young Dancers Competition) was an international dancing competition that was held for the first time in London, United Kingdom on 1 September 2007. The competition was repeated in 2008 when it was held in Glasgow, United Kingdom, but has not been held since.

Eurovision Magic Circus Show

The Eurovision Magic Circus Show was an entertainment show organised by the EBU, which began in 2010 and ended in 2012. Children aged between 7-14, representing countries within the EBU, performed a variety of circus acts at the Geneva Christmas Circus. The main show was also accompanied by the Magic Circus Show Orchestra.

Eurovision Choir

Eurovision Choir (formerly Eurovision Choir of the Year) is a new event launched by the EBU, and the latest event to be launched since the Eurovision Magic Circus Show. The event consists of non-professional choirs who are members of the EBU, with the inaugural contest taking place on 22 July 2017, hosted by the Latvian broadcaster Latvijas Televīzija (LTV), coinciding with the closing ceremony of the European Choir Games 2017. The contest returned for a second edition in August 2019 staged in Gothenburg, Sweden. Following its initial cancellation in June 2021 by Interkultur, in October 2022 it was announced by the EBU that the event would return in 2023, hosted by Latvijas Televīzija for the second time in the contest's history.

European Sports Championships

The European Sports Championships is a multi-sport event involving some of the leading sports in Europe. The European Governing Bodies for athletics, swimming, cycling, rowing and triathlon, will co-ordinate their individual championships as part of the first edition in the summer of 2018, hosted by the cities of Berlin (already chosen as the host for the 2018 European Athletics Championships) and Glasgow (already chosen as the host for the 2018 European Aquatics Championships, and which will now also host the events of the other sports).

Eurovision Asia Song Contest
The Eurovision Asia Song Contest was a proposed Asia-Pacific counterpart of the Eurovision Song Contest. The inaugural contest was set to consist of only one show. However, in 2021, SBS Commissioning Editor Josh Martin confirmed that the contest would not take place despite earlier plans.

Other events
Routine transmissions of sport and culture events amount to over 15,000 transmission hours per year.
High-profile Eurovision events include:

 The Proms
 Eastertime papal blessing Urbi et Orbi
 Euroclassic Notturno
 Palio in Siena
 Rose d'Or
 Musikantenstadl
 Stadlshow
 Vienna New Year's Concert
 Summer Night Concert Schönbrunn
 Congratulations: 50 Years of the Eurovision Song Contest
 Eurovision Song Contest's Greatest Hits
 Eurosonic Noorderslag
 European Border Breakers Award
 Euroradio Folk Festival
 
 Eurovision Debate
 Eurovision: Europe Shine A Light

News
Member broadcasting organisations also provide each other with news footage (over 30,000 separate news items per year) within the framework of the daily Eurovision News Exchanges (EVN). Eurovision also sponsors the annual broadcast news industry conference, News Xchange. Despite the similarity in name this has no direct connection with Eurovision News Exchanges.

Eurovision Sports 
Eurovision has offered free internet streaming of major sports events such as the London 2012 Olympics on its website, under the name Eurovision Sports.

Eurovision Sports is also offering all FIFA World Cup coverage for 2018 and 2022, and is providing coverage of the 2021 FINA World Swimming Championships.

Eurosport was created in 1989 by the EBU as a method of exploiting the member stations' sports rights.

Transmission ident
Eurovision television transmissions may be recognised by the Eurovision ident and the opening theme of Marc-Antoine Charpentier's "Te Deum" which appears before and after the programme to indicate to viewers they are connected and watching via the Eurovision network. The most famous and well known times for this to occur is before and after the Eurovision Song Contest, although most contributed items, such as international relays of sports events, including the Olympics, are not thus credited and the general public is therefore mostly unaware of Eurovision's involvement.

References

External links

 
 Eurovision Active Member List
 The Birth of Eurovision (in French)
 Eurovision Sports Live Streaming

 
Television networks in Switzerland
Radio networks
1954 establishments in Switzerland
European Broadcasting Union